O'Farrell (formerly and still frequently informally known to as South Encanto) is an urban neighborhood in the southeastern region of San Diego, California. The community borders the neighborhoods of Encanto to the north, Skyline and North Bay Terrace to the east, Alta Vista to the south, and Valencia Park to the west.

Government 
O'Farrell is located within the 4th City Council District of San Diego. The district is currently represented by Monica Montgomery Steppe, who assumed office in 2018. Federally, the neighborhood is within California's 53rd congressional district.

See also 

 List of neighborhoods of San Diego, California

References

External links 

 List of neighborhoods in San Diego

Urban communities in San Diego
Neighborhoods in San Diego